Ssekikubo Theodore (born 20 August 1969) in Ssembabule, is a Ugandan politician. He represents Lwemiyaga County, Sembabule District in the Parliament of Uganda.

Education 
At Makerere University, he earned a Bachelor of Arts in Social Sciences, Master of Public Administration and Management and a Bachelor of Laws.
At Law Development Centre, Kampala, he earned a Postgraduate diploma in Legal practice.

Career
Before joining politics, he worked in the Ministry of Defence as an assistant secretary in the administrative office.
He worked as a lecturer at Ndejje University from 1998–1999.
In 2016, Ssekikubo joined the race for deputy speaker of the parliament of Uganda but eventually lost to Jacob Oulanyah the current speaker.

Arrest
On 10 January 2020, he was arrested for allegedly "inciting the public to move cattle in a quarantine area." He was granted bail on January 14, but was re-arrested on Jan.16.

References

1969 births
Living people
National Resistance Movement politicians
Members of the Parliament of Uganda
21st-century Ugandan politicians